The 2021–22 Futsal Club Championship was the inaugural edition of the Futsal Club Championship, an annual futsal club tournament in India organised by the All India Football Federation (AIFF), being held in New Delhi. It was initially planned to be organised in July – August 2020. However, due to COVID-19 pandemic, the championship was held from 5–13 November in K. D. Jadhav Indoor Hall of Indira Gandhi Arena.

Format 
The Futsal Club Championship 2021 featured a total of 16 teams, who were divided into four groups, and played in a round-robin format. The highest-placed team from each group made it to the semi-final stage, which was played in a knockout format amongst the four teams. The winners of the tournament, Delhi FC, became the first-ever futsal champions of India, and thus India's first ever AFC Futsal Club Championship representative.

Teams 
AIFF invited clubs playing in Indian Super League, I-League and state level futsal champions to participate in the inaugural season, and 16 teams participated.

Group stage

Group A

Group B

Group C

Group D

Knock-out stage

Bracket

Semi-final

Final

Top scorers

References 

2021
Futsal competitions in India
2021 in Asian futsal
November 2021 sports events in Asia
Football in Delhi
Futsal Club Championship, 2020 AIFF